Palazzo della Carovana (also Palazzo dei Cavalieri) is a palace in Knights' Square, Pisa, Italy, presently housing the main building of the Scuola Normale Superiore di Pisa.

History
It was built in 1562–1564 by Giorgio Vasari for the headquarters of the Knights of St. Stephen, as a renovation of the already existing Palazzo degli Anziani ("Palace of the Elders"). The name, meaning "Palace of the Convoy", derives from the three-year period undertaken by the initiates of the Order for their training, called "la Carovana".

The façade is characterized by a complex scheme with sgraffiti representing allegorical figures and zodiacal signs, designed by Vasari himself and sculpted by Tommaso di Battista del Verrocchio and Alessandro Forzori, coupled to busts and marble crests. The current paintings date however to the 19th-20th centuries.

Amongst the sculptures are the Medici Coat of Arms and that of the Knights, flanked by the allegories of Religion and Justice by Stoldo Lorenzi (1563). The upper gallery of busts of the Grand Dukes of Tuscany (who were all also the Grand Masters of the Order) were added  in the late 16th-early 18th centuries, sculpted by Ridolfo Sirigatti, Pietro Tacca and Giovan Battista Foggini.The double-ramp staircase was remade in 1821. The rear area is a modern addition (1928–1930) for the Scuola Normale Superiore di Pisa. Some halls of the interior house 16th-century paintings.

External links
Palazzo della Carovana

Houses completed in 1564
Carovana
Renaissance architecture in Pisa
Scuola Normale Superiore di Pisa
Giorgio Vasari buildings